The 2022 Colorado Rapids season is the club's twenty-seventh season of existence and their twenty-seventh consecutive season in Major League Soccer (MLS), the top flight of American soccer.

Background

Colorado finished the 2021 season 1st in the Western Conference table, and 2nd overall in MLS. They reached the semifinals of the MLS Cup Playoffs, losing to the Portland Timbers 1–0.

Roster

Out on loan

Competitions

Preseason

Major League Soccer

Standings

Western Conference

Overall table

Results summary

Match results

CONCACAF Champions League

Round of 16

U.S. Open Cup

Due to their entry in the CONCACAF Champions League, the Rapids entered the U.S. Open Cup in the Round of 32. The draw for the Round of 32 took place on April 21, and the Rapids drew Minnesota United FC.

Statistics

Appearances and goals
Numbers after plus–sign (+) denote appearances as a substitute.

Top scorers
{| class="wikitable" style="font-size: 95%; text-align: center;"
|-
!width=30|Rank
!width=30|Position
!width=30|Number
!width=175|Name
!width=75|
!width=75|
!width=75|
!width=75|Total
|-
|rowspan=1| 1
| FW || 11 ||  Diego Rubio
| 16 || 0 || 0 || 16
|-
|rowspan=1| 2
| FW || 29 ||  Gyasi Zardes
| 9 || 0 || 0 || 9
|-
|rowspan=1| 3
| FW || 7 ||  Jonathan Lewis
| 4 || 0 || 0 || 4
|-
|rowspan=1| 4
| DF || 6 ||  Lalas Abubakar
| 4 || 0 || 0 || 4
|-
|rowspan=1| 5
| MF || 14 ||  Mark-Anthony Kaye
| 3 || 0 || 0 || 3
|-
|rowspan=2| 6
| DF || 2 ||  Keegan Rosenberry
| 2 || 0 || 0 || 2
|-
| FW || 12 ||  Michael Barrios
| 2 || 0 || 0 || 2
|-
|rowspan=7| 8
| MF || 8 ||  Max
| 0 || 0 || 1 || 1
|-
| FW || 9 ||  Andre Shinyashiki
| 1 || 0 || 0 || 1
|-
| FW || 15 ||  Sam Nicholson
| 1 || 0 || 0 || 1
|-
| MF || 20 ||  Nicolás Mezquida
| 0 || 1 || 0 || 1
|-
| MF || 32 ||  Collen Warner
| 1 || 0 || 0 || 1
|-
| FW || 37 ||  Dantouma Toure
| 1 || 0 || 0 || 1
|-
| DF || 66 ||  Lucas Esteves
| 1 || 0 || 0 || 1
|-
!colspan="4"|Total !! 46 !! 1 !! 1 !! 48
|-

Top assists
{| class="wikitable" style="font-size: 95%; text-align: center;"
|-
!width=30|Rank
!width=30|Position
!width=30|Number
!width=175|Name
!width=75|
!width=75|
!width=75|
!width=75|Total
|-
|rowspan=1| 1
| FW || 12 ||  Michael Barrios
| 7 || 0 || 0 || 7
|-
|rowspan=1| 2
| FW || 11 ||  Diego Rubio
| 6 || 0 || 0 || 6
|-
|rowspan=4| 3
| DF || 2 ||  Keegan Rosenberry
| 2 || 0 || 1 || 3
|-
| MF || 19 ||  Jack Price
| 3 || 0 || 0 || 3
|-
| MF || 21 ||  Bryan Acosta
| 3 || 0 || 0 || 3
|-
| DF || 66 ||  Lucas Esteves
| 3 || 0 || 0 || 3
|-
|rowspan=5| 7
| DF || 4 ||  Danny Wilson
| 2 || 0 || 0 || 2
|-
| FW || 7 ||  Jonathan Lewis
| 2 || 0 || 0 || 2
|-
| MF || 13 ||  Felipe Gutiérrez
| 2 || 0 || 0 || 2
|-
| FW || 29 ||  Gyasi Zardes
| 2 || 0 || 0 || 2
|-
| DF || 33 ||  Steven Beitashour
| 2 || 0 || 0 || 2
|-
|rowspan=3| 12
| DF || 6 ||  Lalas Abubakar
| 1 || 0 || 0 || 1
|-
| MF || 8 ||  Max
| 1 || 0 || 0 || 1
|-
| MF || 14 ||  Mark-Anthony Kaye
| 1 || 0 || 0 || 1
|-
!colspan="4"|Total !! 37 !! 0 !! 1 !! 38
|-

Clean sheets
{| class="wikitable" style="font-size: 95%; text-align: center;"
|-
!width=30|Rank
!width=30|Position
!width=30|Number
!width=175|Name
!width=75|
!width=75|
!width=75|
!width=75|Total
|-
|rowspan=1| 1
| GK || 22 ||  William Yarbrough
| 9 || 0 || 1 || 10
|-
!colspan="4"|Total !! 9 !! 0 !! 1 !! 10

Disciplinary record
{| class="wikitable" style="text-align:center;"
|-
| rowspan="2" !width=15|Rank
| rowspan="2" !width=15|
| rowspan="2" !width=15|
| rowspan="2" !width=120|Player
| colspan="3"|MLS
| colspan="3"|US Open Cup
| colspan="3"|CONCACAF Champion's League
| colspan="3"|Total
|-
!width=34; background:#fe9;|
!width=34; background:#fe9;|
!width=34; background:#ff8888;|
!width=34; background:#fe9;|
!width=34; background:#fe9;|
!width=34; background:#ff8888;|
!width=34; background:#fe9;|
!width=34; background:#fe9;|
!width=34; background:#ff8888;|
!width=34; background:#fe9;|
!width=34; background:#fe9;|
!width=34; background:#ff8888;|
|-
|rowspan=1| 1
| 21 || MF ||  Bryan Acosta
| 10 || 1 || 0 || 0 || 0 || 0 || 0 || 0 || 0 || 10 || 1 || 0
|-
|rowspan=1| 2
| 11 || FW ||  Diego Rubio
| 9 || 1 || 0 || 0 || 0 || 0 || 0 || 0 || 0 || 9 || 1 || 0
|-
|rowspan=1| 3
| 6 || DF ||  Lalas Abubakar
| 9 || 0 || 0 || 0 || 0 || 0 || 0 || 0 || 0 || 9 || 0 || 0
|-
|rowspan=1| 4
| 4 || DF ||  Danny Wilson
| 7 || 0 || 0 || 0 || 0 || 0 || 0 || 0 || 0 || 7 || 0 || 0
|-
|rowspan=2| 5
| 66 || DF ||  Lucas Esteves
| 5 || 0 || 1 || 0 || 0 || 0 || 0 || 0 || 0 || 5 || 0 || 1
|-
| 8 || MF ||  Max
| 5 || 0 || 0 || 1 || 0 || 0 || 0 || 0 || 0 || 6 || 0 || 0
|-
|rowspan=3| 7
| 24 || DF ||  Gustavo Vallecilla
| 3 || 1 || 1 || 0 || 0 || 0 || 0 || 0 || 0 || 3 || 1 || 1
|-
| 5 || DF ||  Auston Trusty
| 4 || 1 || 0 || 0 || 0 || 0 || 0 || 0 || 0 || 4 || 1 || 0
|-
| 12 || FW ||  Michael Barrios
| 5 || 0 || 0 || 0 || 0 || 0 || 0 || 0 || 0 || 5 || 0 || 0
|-
|rowspan=3| 10
| 2 || DF ||  Keegan Rosenberry
| 4 || 0 || 0 || 0 || 0 || 0 || 0 || 0 || 0 || 4 || 0 || 0
|-
| 7 || MF ||  Jonathan Lewis
| 4 || 0 || 0 || 0 || 0 || 0 || 0 || 0 || 0 || 4 || 0 || 0
|-
| 22 || GK ||  William Yarbrough
| 4 || 0 || 0 || 0 || 0 || 0 || 0 || 0 || 0 || 4 || 0 || 0
|-
|rowspan=5| 13
| 13 || MF ||  Felipe Gutiérrez
| 3 || 0 || 0 || 0 || 0 || 0 || 0 || 0 || 0 || 3 || 0 || 0
|-
| 14 || MF ||  Mark-Anthony Kaye
| 2 || 0 || 0 || 0 || 0 || 0 || 1 || 0 || 0 || 3 || 0 || 0
|-
| 19 || MF ||  Jack Price
| 3 || 0 || 0 || 0 || 0 || 0 || 0 || 0 || 0 || 3 || 0 || 0
|-
| 32 || MF ||  Collen Warner
| 3 || 0 || 0 || 0 || 0 || 0 || 0 || 0 || 0 || 3 || 0 || 0
|-
| 33 || DF ||  Steven Beitashour
| 3 || 0 || 0 || 0 || 0 || 0 || 0 || 0 || 0 || 3 || 0 || 0
|-
|rowspan=2| 18
| 77 || FW ||  Darren Yapi
| 2 || 0 || 0 || 0 || 0 || 0 || 0 || 0 || 0 || 2 || 0 || 0
|-
| 97 || MF ||  Ralph Priso-Mbongue
| 2 || 0 || 0 || 0 || 0 || 0 || 0 || 0 || 0 || 2 || 0 || 0
|-
|rowspan=3| 20
| 9 || FW ||  Andre Shinyashiki
| 1 || 0 || 0 || 0 || 0 || 0 || 0 || 0 || 0 || 1 || 0 || 0
|-
| 29 || FW ||  Gyasi Zardes
| 1 || 0 || 0 || 0 || 0 || 0 || 0 || 0 || 0 || 1 || 0 || 0
|-
| 37 || FW ||  Dantouma Toure
| 1 || 0 || 0 || 0 || 0 || 0 || 0 || 0 || 0 || 1 || 0 || 0
|-
!colspan="4"|Total !! 90 !! 4 !! 2 !! 1 !! 0 !! 0 !! 1 !! 0 !! 0 !! 90 !! 4 !! 2

Transfers

For transfers in, dates listed are when the Rapids officially signed the players to the roster. For transfers out, dates are listed when the Rapids officially removed the players from the roster, not when they signed with another club. If a player later signed with a different club, his new club will be noted, but the date listed remains when he was officially removed from the roster.

In

Loans in

SuperDraft

Draft picks are not automatically signed to the team roster. Only those who are signed to a contract will be listed as transfers in. Only trades involving draft picks and executed after the start of the 2022 MLS SuperDraft will be listed in the notes.

Out

Loans out

See also
 Colorado Rapids
 2022 in American soccer
 2022 Major League Soccer season

References

Colorado Rapids seasons
Colorado Rapids
Colorado Rapids
Colorado Rapids
Colorado